Ranby is a village and civil parish in the East Lindsey district of Lincolnshire, England. It is in the civil parish of Market Stainton.

"Randebi" is listed in the 1086 Domesday Book, consisting of 29 households, a mill and one church.

The parish church, a Grade II listed building dedicated to Saint German (Saint Germain), dates from the 12th century, although it was rebuilt in 1861 by James Fowler reusing earlier fragments.

Ranby Hall is a Grade II listed brick country house dating from 1868.

References

External links

Villages in Lincolnshire
Civil parishes in Lincolnshire
East Lindsey District